Alan McGowan is a former Irish rugby union player who played fly-half for Leinster Rugby and Blackrock College RFC.

On 5 November 1994, McGowan gained his only cap for Ireland, kicking 13 points in a win over the United States at Lansdowne Road.

References

1972 births
Living people
Irish rugby union players
Leinster Rugby players
Rugby union fly-halves
Ireland international rugby union players
Blackrock College RFC players
Rugby union players from Dublin (city)